José Solano may refer to:

José Solano (actor) (born 1971), American actor
José Solano y Bote (1726–1806), Spanish naval officer
José Solano, executive producer of the Mexican television soap opera Bellezas Indomables

See also
Solano (surname)